Asolene petiti is a species of freshwater snail, an aquatic gastropod mollusk in the family Ampullariidae, the apple snails and their allies.

The specific name petiti is in honor of Emil Charles Nicolai Petit (1817–1893), who collected this snail.

Distribution 
The distribution of Asolene petiti includes Brazil. Specifically, Mato Grosso.

References

External links 

Ampullariidae
Gastropods described in 1891